Agua Caliente Casino may refer to:

United States
 Agua Caliente Casino Resort Spa, in Rancho Mirage, California

 Spa Resort and Casino in downtown Palm Springs, California, operated by the Agua Caliente Band of Cahuilla Indians

Mexico
 Agua Caliente Casino and Hotel, in Tijuana